Fujian is a province of China, with the vast majority administered by the People's Republic of China (PRC), and the offshore islands of Kinmen (Quemoy, Jinmen, etc.) and Matsu administered by the Republic of China (ROC) on Taiwan.

The PRC-administered Fujian Province is made up of three levels of administrative division: prefecture-level, county-level, and township-level. The ROC-administered Fujian consists of 67 counties and 2 cities (Fuzhou and Xiamen). Among the two of its 67 counties are Kinmen and Lienchiang.

All of these administrative divisions are explained in greater detail at administrative divisions of the People's Republic of China. This chart lists only prefecture-level and county-level divisions of Fujian as given by the PRC.

For the list of township-level divisions within each county, see list of township-level divisions of Fujian.

Administrative divisions

Administrative divisions history

Recent changes in administrative divisions

Population composition

Prefectures

Counties

See also 
 List of township-level divisions of Fujian, for the township-level divisions within each county

References

 
Fujian